Te Kāea (or Te Kaea News as written on television guides) is a nightly New Zealand television news show that airs on Whakaata Māori at 6:30pm. It is repeated at 10:30pm, and has English subtitles. Te Kāea is also shown in Australia, helped by Whakaata Maori's "strong collaborative relationship" with Australia's NITV as members of the World Indigenous Television Broadcasters Network (WITBN).

Te Kāea is anchored by Piripi Taylor.

References

External links
 

New Zealand television news shows
Māori Television original programming
2004 New Zealand television series debuts
2000s New Zealand television series
2010s New Zealand television series
2020s New Zealand television series